is a retired Japanese sprinter and currently coach.

Coaching career
He has been the Strengthening Committee Member of the Japan Association of Athletics Federations since 2007.

University coaching career
Josai University - Director ( - 2014)
Toyo University - Sprint coach (2014 - present)

He is currently the sprint coach of the track and field club at Toyo University. He was previously the director of the track and field club at Josai University.

Notable Toyo University athletes trained by Hiroyasu Tsuchie include:
Yoshihide Kiryu - He still trains with Tsuchie.
Julian Walsh

Coaching honors
Mizuno Sports Mentor Award - Silver Award 2017

Personal life
His father Ryokichi Tsuchie is the 1965 Japanese Championships champion in the 200 metres.

Competition record

National titles
Japanese Championships
100 metres: 1999
200 metres: 1998

Personal bests
100 metres - 10.21 s (+1.0 m/s) (Tottori 2004)
100 metres - 10.09 s (+3.3 m/s) (Shizuoka 1999): Wind-assisted
200 metres - 20.86 s (0.0 m/s) (Fujiyoshida 2003)
200 metres - 20.86 s (+0.7 m/s) (Okayama 2003)
4×100 metres relay - 38.31 s (3rd leg) (Athens 1997): Former Asian and Japanese record

References

External links

Hiroyasu Tsuchie at JAAF  (archived)
Hiroyasu Tsuchie at JOC 
Hiroyasu Tsuchie at Toyo University 

1974 births
Living people
Sportspeople from Shimane Prefecture
Japanese athletics coaches
Japanese male sprinters
Olympic male sprinters
Olympic athletes of Japan
Athletes (track and field) at the 1996 Summer Olympics
Athletes (track and field) at the 2004 Summer Olympics
Asian Games gold medalists for Japan
Asian Games silver medalists for Japan
Asian Games medalists in athletics (track and field)
Athletes (track and field) at the 1998 Asian Games
Athletes (track and field) at the 2002 Asian Games
Medalists at the 1998 Asian Games
Medalists at the 2002 Asian Games
Competitors at the 1995 Summer Universiade
World Athletics Championships athletes for Japan
Japan Championships in Athletics winners
Waseda University alumni